The Memphis Grizzlies were first located in Vancouver after the National Basketball Association (NBA) granted the city an expansion team on April 27, 1994, and they first participated in the NBA draft in 1995. However, the Grizzlies win–loss record after six seasons was only 101-359 (.220), and on July 4, 2001, the league's board of governors approved a move to Memphis, where the team has been located ever since.

In 1989, the NBA agreed with the National Basketball Players' Association to limit drafts to two rounds, an arrangement that has remained the same up the present time. Before each draft, an NBA draft lottery determines the first round selection order for the teams that missed the playoffs during the prior season. Teams can also trade their picks, which means that in some drafts teams may have more or less than two draft picks, although they must have at least one first-round pick every other year.

Seven of the players that the Grizzlies have drafted were named to the NBA All-Rookie Team first team in their respective rookie seasons—Shareef Abdur-Rahim in 1997, Mike Bibby in 1999, Shane Battier, Pau Gasol in 2002, Rudy Gay in 2007, Jaren Jackson Jr. in 2019, and Ja Morant in 2020—Gasol was named the Rookie of the Year in 2002 while Morant was named the Rookie of the Year in 2020.

Key

Selections

Notes
 On June 19, 1996 the Grizzlies traded two 2nd round picks in the 1996 NBA Draft and a 2nd round pick in the 1997 NBA Draft to Houston for Pete Chilcutt, Tim Breaux, a 1st round pick in the 1996 NBA Draft, a 2nd round pick in the 1996 NBA Draft and a conditional 2nd round pick in the 1997 NBA Draft.
 On June 25, 1996, the Grizzlies traded the rights to C. J. Bruton to the Portland Trail Blazers for cash.
 On August 27, 1999, the Grizzlies traded Tony Massenburg, Lee Mayberry, Makhtar N'Diaye, Rodrick Rhodes, Michael Smith, and the rights to Steve Francis in a three-team deal involving the Houston Rockets and the Orlando Magic, in return for Michael Dickerson, Othella Harrington, Antoine Carr, Brent Price, and a future first and second-round pick.
 On October 28, 1997, the Grizzlies traded Roy Rogers to the Boston Celtics for Tony Massenburg and a 2nd round draft.
 On July 16, 1996, the Grizzlies traded their 1998 and 1999 second round picks to the Los Angeles Lakers for Anthony Peeler, George Lynch and the Lakers' 1998 and 1999 2nd round draft picks.
 On January 30, 2001, the Grizzlies traded Othella Harrington to the New York Knicks for Erick Strickland and the Knicks' first and second-round draft picks.
 On June 30, 2001, the Grizzlies traded Shareef Abdur-Rahim and the rights to Jamaal Tinsley to the Atlanta Hawks for Lorenzen Wright, Brevin Knight, and the rights to Pau Gasol.
 On June 26, 2002, the Grizzlies traded Nick Anderson and the rights to Matt Barnes to the Cleveland Cavaliers in exchange for Wesley Person.
 On June 26, 2003, the Grizzlies traded the rights to Marcus Banks and Kendrick Perkins to the Boston Celtics in exchange for the rights to Troy Bell and Dahntay Jones.
The Memphis Grizzlies receive O. J. Mayo, Marko Jaric, Antoine Walker and Greg Buckner from the Minnesota Timberwolves in exchange for Kevin Love, Mike Miller, Brian Cardinal, and Jason Collins.
The Los Angeles Lakers have acquired forward Pau Gasol and a second round draft choice in 2010 from the Grizzlies in exchange for forward Kwame Brown, guard Javaris Crittenton, guard Aaron McKie, the draft rights to Marc Gasol and first round picks in 2008 (Donté Greene) and 2010.
The Grizzlies then acquired draft rights to Darrell Arthur from the Rockets for draft rights to Donté Greene and a 2009 second-round pick.

References
General

Specific

 
National Basketball Association draft
draft history